Santini SMS is a cycling clothes brand of the Italian clothing production company Santini Maglificio Sportivo. This company was founded by Pietro Santini in 1965 and is based in Lallio, Italy.

Provider of cycling jerseys

Santini SMS provided the pink jersey in the Giro d'Italia from 1993 to 2017. Since 2017 they also provide the red leader's jersey in the Vuelta a España. Since 1994 the brand is the clothes sponsor of the Union Cycliste Internationale (UCI) and the UCI World Championships. Santini SMS provides the rainbow jerseys, the official UCI World Champion jerseys across all disciplines. Santini SMS delivers as well the European Champion jersey for all cycling disciplines and the World Cup leader jerseys for women's road, track cycling, mountain bike and cyclo-cross.
The brand also delivers the jerseys for the UCI ProTour and the leading jerseys in stage races like Tour Down Under and the Critérium du Dauphiné. The contract with the UCI  started in 1994 and was prolonged with two years in 2012 until 2014.

As Santini provides the jerseys of the Slovakian national cycling team, Peter Sagan won his historic three back-to-back UCI road race world champion titles 2015, 2016 and 2017 in a Santini jersey.

Starting in 2022 they will also provide the official Tour de France jerseys.

Teams
Santini SMS is and was also the cycling clothes sponsor of a number of cycling teams including:
 Trek–Segafredo 
 Nippo–Vini Fantini 
 Boels–Dolmans 
 Belkin Pro Cycling Team
 La Vie Claire
 Mapei
 Mercatone Uno
 Acqua & Sapone
 Selle Italia
 Lampre–Fondital / Lampre-NGC
 Team Katusha
 Diquigiovanni–Androni Giocattoli
 Vacansoleil–DCM
 Slovakian national team
 Australian national team
 Irish national team
 CatfordCC Equipe/Banks
 AMKO Sport (1982)

See also

Sportswear (activewear)

Notes

References

External links

 

Clothing companies of Italy
Sportswear brands
Clothing companies established in 1965
Sporting goods manufacturers of Italy
Italian companies established in 1965
Italian brands